Song Qing is a fictional character in Water Margin, one of the Four Great Classical Novels in Chinese literature. Nicknamed "Iron Fan", he ranks 76th among the 108 Stars of Destiny and 40th among the 72 Earthly Fiends.

Background
Song Qing is the younger brother of Song Jiang. While Song Jiang is famous in jianghu  (the scofflaw community) for his chivalry and lives in the town district of Yuncheng, being a clerk of the county's magistrate, Song Qing keeps a low profile, taking care of their father at their suburban house and managing the family's properties.

Tricking Song Jiang to come home
After killing his mistress Yan Poxi in a fit of anger, Song Jiang sneaks back to hide in his father's house. Although sent to arrest him, Yuncheng's chief constable Zhu Tong lets Song off after finding him hiding in a pit in his house. Song decides to seek refuge in the house of the nobleman Chai Jin. He travels there with Song Qing.

Later Song Qing returns home while Song Jiang moves to the Kong Family Manor at Mount White Tiger. He subsequently shifts to Hua Rong's house at Qingfeng Fort in Qingzhou. While in Qingzhou, he sparks a battle between his bandit friends at Mount Qingfeng and the local government.

Despite having beaten the army from Qingzhou, Song Jiang, Hua Rong and the bandits of Mount Qingfeng, fearing attack by a bigger government force, decamp to join Liangshan Marsh. On the way, Song Jiang runs into Shi Yong in an inn, who has a letter from Song Qing which says their father has passed on and urges him to rush home for the funeral. Upon reaching home, Song Jiang is shocked to find his father alive and well. In fact, Song Qing has penned the letter under the instruction of their father, who fears Song Jiang will tarnish the family's reputation by falling into bad company.

As it is not possible to keep his homecoming a secret, Song Jiang is arrested by Yuncheng's authorities for the murder of Yan Poxi. He is exiled to a prison camp in Jiangzhou (江州; present-day Jiujiang, Jiangxi).

Joining Liangshan
Song Jiang finally joins Liangshan after getting into yet more troubles, this time in Jiangzhou, which nearly got him killed. Worried that his family will be implicated, Song, after being elected second-in-command of Liangshan, goes back to Yuncheng personally to fetch his father and brother. Song Qing thus becomes a member of Liangshan.

Campaigns
Song Qing is placed in charge of organising banquets after the 108 Stars of Destiny came together in what is called the Grand Assembly. He participates in the campaigns against the Liao invaders and rebel forces on Song territory following amnesty from Emperor Huizong for Liangshan.

Song Qing is one of the few Liangshan heroes who survives all the campaigns. Although he is conferred an appointment, he declines it, choosing  to return home to tend to his family's properties.

References
 
 
 
 
 
 
 

72 Earthly Fiends
Fictional farmers
Fictional characters from Shandong